Caesium sesquioxide is a chemical compound with the formula  or . Compared to the other caesium oxides, this phase is less well studied, but has been long present in the literature. It can be created by thermal decomposition of caesium superoxide at 290 °C.

The compound is often studied as an example of a Verwey type charge ordering transition at low temperatures. There were some theoretical suggestions that  would be a ferromagnetic half metal, but along with the closely related rubidium sesquioxide, experimental results found a magnetically frustrated system. Below about 200 K, the structure changes to tetragonal symmetry. Electron paramagnetic resonance and nuclear magnetic resonance measurements show a complicated low temperature magnetic behavior that depends on the orientation of the oxygen dimers and superexchange through the caesium atoms.

References

Caesium compounds
Sesquioxides